Dolian is a rural settlement in the Roche-à-Bateaux commune of the Côteaux Arrondissement, in the Sud department of Haiti.

See also
Debaucher
Roche-à-Bateaux

References

Populated places in Sud (department)